George Hobart, 3rd Earl of Buckinghamshire (8 September 173114 November 1804) was a British peer, styled The Honourable George Hobart from 1733 until 1793.

Life
Hobart was the son of John Hobart, 1st Earl of Buckinghamshire by his second wife, Elizabeth Bristow. He was educated at Westminster School and visited the University of Göttingen.

Hobart represented the constituencies of St Ives and Bere Alston in the House of Commons from 1754 to 1761 and 1761 to 1780, respectively. He was secretary to the embassy in St Petersburg in 1762, his half-brother John Hobart, 2nd Earl of Buckinghamshire being then ambassador.

He inherited the earldom of Buckinghamshire from his half-brother, who had no surviving sons, in 1793. On 29 April 1797, he was commissioned colonel of the 3rd Regiment of Lincolnshire Militia (South Lincolnshire Supplementary Militia), becoming a colonel in the regular army when his regiment was embodied on 12 January 1799. He died in 1804 and was succeeded by his son Robert, who had already entered the House of Lords in 1798 by a writ of acceleration as Baron Hobart.

Family
Hobart married Albinia Bertie, second daughter of Lord Vere Bertie and the heiress Ann Casey, on 16 May 1757. They had eight children:
Robert Hobart, 4th Earl of Buckinghamshire (1760–1816)
Hon. George Vere Hobart (17615 December 1802), married first Jane Cataneo and had issue, married second, in April 1802, Janet Maclean and had issue
Lt. the Hon. Charles Hobart, RN (died April 1782)
Rev. the Hon. Henry Lewis Hobart (17748 May 1846), married Charlotte Selina Moore and had issue
Lady Albinia Hobart, married Richard Cumberland on 14 Jul 1784 and had issue
Lady Henrietta Anne Barbara Hobart (c. 17621828), married, in 1789, John Sullivan and had issue
Lady Maria Frances Hobart (c. 17621794), married George North, 3rd Earl of Guilford and had issue
Lady Charlotte Hobart (died 1798), married Col. Edward Disbrowe (died 1818) and had issue, including Edward Cromwell Disbrowe.

References

External links

|-

1731 births
1804 deaths
British Militia officers
Hobart, George
Hobart, George
Hobart, George
Hobart, George
Diplomatic peers
3
Hobart, George
People educated at Westminster School, London
George
Members of the Parliament of Great Britain for St Ives
University of Göttingen alumni